Meiya Tireira (born 15 April 1986) is a Malian women's basketball player for Valencia Basket in the Spanish Women's League. A member of the Mali women's national basketball team, Tireira competed in all 5 of Mali's matches at the 2008 Summer Olympics, scoring a total of 16 points and grabbing 19 rebounds.

References

External links

1986 births
Living people
African Games gold medalists for Mali
African Games medalists in basketball
Basketball players at the 2008 Summer Olympics
Centers (basketball)
Competitors at the 2011 All-Africa Games
Competitors at the 2015 African Games
Forwards (basketball)
G.D. Interclube women's basketball players
Malian expatriate basketball people in Angola
Malian expatriate basketball people in Spain
Malian expatriate basketball people in Tunisia
Malian women's basketball players
Olympic basketball players of Mali
Sportspeople from Bamako
21st-century Malian people